The Cathedral of Saint Peter is the mother church of the Catholic Diocese of Rockford. It is the second church to serve the diocese as its cathedral.

History

The parish had its beginnings with the establishment of St. William's chapel in 1915. It was established as a mission of St. Mary's parish downtown. Property on the summit of Council Hill, also known as Piety Hill, was purchased in 1920 for a new parish. A combination church and school was built on Court Street beginning in 1921. 

The cornerstone for the present church was blessed by Bishop Loras Lane in August 1958 and it was dedicated on May 15, 1960. Bishop Arthur O'Neill designated St. Peter's as the diocesan cathedral on October 11, 1970. St. James on North Second Street in Rockford had been the pro-cathedral of the diocese from its foundation in 1908. Bishop Lane planned to construct a large pyramid-shaped cathedral, but his untimely death and the high projected construction costs doomed the project. What he had founded in 1962 as "Cathedral Parish" for the new cathedral was renamed Holy Family Parish. O'Neill formally consecrated St. Peter's on October 11, 1978. The present altar was consecrated by Cardinal Francis George of Chicago on September 29, 1998.

Pipe organ
St. Peter's houses a 1978 Wicks Organ Company pipe organ, Opus 5706. It is located in the rear gallery of the cathedral. Some of the pipes are exposed in the large case that frames a rose window. The organ features 5 divisions, 45 stops, 47 ranks, and 2,707 pipes. The manual compass is 61 notes and the pedal compass is 32 notes.

See also
List of Catholic cathedrals in the United States
List of cathedrals in the United States

References

External links
 Official Cathedral Site
 Diocese of Rockford Official Site

Christian organizations established in 1922
Roman Catholic churches completed in 1960
Churches in the Roman Catholic Diocese of Rockford
Peter Rockford
Churches in Winnebago County, Illinois
Buildings and structures in Rockford, Illinois
Italianate architecture in Illinois
20th-century Roman Catholic church buildings in the United States
Italianate church buildings in the United States